Christmas Song Book may refer to:

 Christmas Song Book (Helen Merrill album), 1991
 Christmas Song Book (Mina album), 2013